Jean d'Yd was the stage name of Jean Paul Félix Didier Perret. He was a French actor and comedian, and was born in Paris on 17 May 1880. He died in Vernon, Eure, France on 14 May 1964.

Selected filmography 

1923: La Dame de Monsoreau (directed by René Le Somptier) - Chicot
1923: Le chant de l'amour triomphant (directed by Victor Tourjansky) - Le serviteur hindou
1923: La souriante Madame Beudet (directed by Germaine Dulac) - Monsieur Labas
1923: Gossette (directed by Germaine Dulac) - Maître Varadès
1924: The Thruster (directed by André Hugon) - L'avocat général
1924: La main qui a tué (directed by Maurice de Marsan and Maurice Gleize) - Inspecteur Bréchet
1926: Nitchevo (directed by Jacques de Baroncelli) - Commandant Le Gossec
1927: Napoléon (directed by Abel Gance) - La Bussière
1928: La Passion de Jeanne d'Arc (directed by Carl Dreyer) - Guillaume Evrard
1931: La fin du monde (directed by Abel Gance) - M. de Murcie
1931:  (directed by Mario Bonnard)
1931: Tu m'oublieras (directed by Henri Diamant-Berger) - Adolphe Dautrive
1932: Monsieur de Pourceaugnac (directed by Gaston Ravel et Tony Lekain) - Le médecin
1932: Une heure (Short, directed by Léo Mittler) - Le père de Jacques
1932: La vitrine (Short, directed by Léo Mittler)
1933: Direct au coeur (directed by Roger Lion) - Journalist #2
1933: Rothchild (directed by Marco de Gastyne) - Le professeur
1934: Les Misérables (directed by Raymond Bernard) - Le directeur de l'école (uncredited)
1934: Tartarin de Tarascon (directed by Raymond Bernard) - Ladevèze
1934: L'article 330 (Short, directed by  Marcel Pagnol)
1935: Amour et publicité (Short, directed by Léo Mittler)
1938: La Rue sans joie (directed by André Hugon) - L'avocat général
1938: Alerte en Méditerranée (directed by Léo Joannon) - Le père Blanc
1939: Entente cordiale (directed by Marcel L'Herbier) - Joë Chamberlain
1940: The Emigrant (directed by Léo Joannon) - L'ingénieur-chef
1942: Les hommes sans peur (directed by Yvan Noé) - Un médecin
1942: Les Visiteurs du soir (directed by Marcel Carné) - Le baladin
1942: Les petits riens (directed by Raymond Bernard)
1943: L'Éternel retour (directed by Jean Delannoy) - Amédée Frossin
1944: Félicie Nanteuil (directed by Marc Allégret) - Le docteur Socrate
1945: La Vie de bohème (directed by Marcel L'Herbier) - (uncredited)
1946: Raboliot (directed by Jacques Daroy) - Touraille
1946: Jericho (directed by Henri Calef) - Un conseiller
1946: Martin Roumagnac (directed by Georges Lacombe) - L'oncle de Blanche
1946: Impasse (directed by Pierre Dard) - Le professeur Sartory
1947: Dreams of Love (directed by Christian Stengel) - Cadolle
1947: Capitaine Blomet (directed by Andrée Feix) - (uncredited)
1948: The Private Life of an Actor (directed by Sacha Guitry) - Lucien Guitry enfant
1948: The Last Vacation (directed by Roger Leenhardt) - Walter Lherminier
1948: Le cavalier de Croix-Mort (directed by Lucien Gasnier-Raymond) - Louis-Antoine
1948: Le colonel Durand (directed by René Chanas)
1949: Fantomas Against Fantomas (directed by Robert Vernay) - Le neurologue
1950: La Belle que voilà (directed by Jean-Paul Le Chanois) - Ceccati
1950: Justice est faite (directed by André Cayatte) - Le supérieur de l'école religieuse
1950: God Needs Men (directed by Jean Delannoy) - Corentin Gourvennec
1952: Agence matrimoniale (directed by Jean-Paul Le Chanois) - Le père de la jeune fille jourde
1953: Lucrèce Borgia (directed by Christian-Jaque) - Le médecin
1954: On Trial (directed by Julien Duvivier) - Le président
1955:  (directed by Jean Delannoy) - Le grand-père de Francis
1956:  (directed by Raoul André) - Félix Mercier
1956: Les Truands (directed by Carlo Rim) - Le grand-père
1958: Les Misérables (directed by Jean-Paul Le Chanois) - Le père Mabeuf
1958: Les naufrageurs (directed by Charles Brabant) - Le curé (final film role)

Theatre 
1958 Monsieur de France by Jacques François, directed by Christian-Gérard Théâtre des Bouffes-Parisiens

External links
 

1880 births
1964 deaths
French male film actors
French male silent film actors
Male actors from Paris
20th-century French male actors